Liu Binyan (February 7, 1925 – December 5, 2005) was a Chinese author, journalist, and political dissident.

Many of the events in Liu's life are recounted in his memoir, A Higher Kind of Loyalty.

Early life
Liu Binyan, whose family hails from Shandong province, was born in 1925, on the fifteenth of the first month of the lunar calendar, in the city of Changchun, Jilin Province. He grew up in Harbin in Heilongjiang province, where he went to school until the ninth grade, after which he had to withdraw for lack of tuition money. He persisted in reading voraciously, especially works about World War II, and in 1944 he joined the Communist Party of China. After 1949 he worked as a reporter and editor for China Youth News and began a long career of writing rooted in an iron devotion to social ideals, an affection for China's ordinary people, and an insistence on honest expression even at the cost of great personal sacrifice.

Outspoken Critic in Early Years of PRC
Liu Binyan published influential critiques of the consequences of Party management in the 1950s. In rapid succession he encountered recognition, approval, criticism, and finally prosecution for crimes against the Party. In October 1955, he acted as the interpreter for visiting Soviet writer Valentin Ovechkin, who later tried to help Liu Binyan by writing a letter to Zhou Enlai. Liu Binyan learned from Ovechkin's style and wrote the work "On the Bridge Worksite".

A Pair of Articles with a Big Impact

In 1956 he published "On the Bridge Worksite" (《在桥梁工地上》 "Zai qiaoliang gongdi shang"), which exposed bureaucratism and corruption, and "The Inside Story of Our Newspaper" ( 《本报内部消息》 "Benbao neibu xiaoxi"), about press control. The two works had a powerful nationwide impact.

According to Liu, "'On the Bridge Construction Site' had been the first piece to criticize the Party itself since Mao Zedong had laid down the dictum in 1942 in his 'Talks at the Yan'an Forum' that writers should 'extol the bright side of life' and 'not expose' the darkness.

Labeled a "Rightist"
In 1957, following the publication of "On the Bridge Worksite" and "The Inside Story of Our Newspaper," Liu was labeled a "rightist" and expelled from the Communist Party (see Hundred Flowers Campaign). The campaign against Liu Binyan was closely associated with the campaign against another social critic and author, Wang Meng, who had recently published a highly influential work, "A New Arrival at the Organization Department."

Interim Years
After being rehabilitated in the 1960s, he again fell out of favor in 1969 and was condemned to a forced labor detention camp, where he spent eight years. After being rehabilitated again, he built up a sound reputation as a reformer and a corruption watchdog.  From 1957 on, he spent roughly 21 years in and out of labor camps.

Second Big Impact: People or Monsters in 1979
In 1978, after the "rightist" label was removed, Liu was re-admitted to the Communist Party but continued, in even starker terms than before, to write "reportage literature" (baogao wenxue) about injustices and the sufferings of ordinary people.

People or Monsters, about a corrupt official in the northern Chinese province of Heilongjiang named Wang Shouxin, created a sensation when it was published in 1979, and became a central element in the effort in China to reflect on and understand the course of Chinese social development, particularly over the course of the Cultural Revolution.

People or Monsters was widely read in China, and was broadly re-distributed following initial publication.  "What was powerful about Liu's piece was it universality: everyone in China knew people like Wang Shouxin, and it made everyone think of all those who had not been brought to justice."

People or Monsters was the first in a series of works describing corruption and social problems, and was noteworthy for its use of fact-based reporting (reportage) in place of pure fiction.

"Di'erzhong Zhongcheng"(《第二种忠诚》)[A Second Kind of Loyalty] (1985) and other essays made him a household name among Chinese readers and cemented his reputation as "China's conscience."   In 1985, when the Chinese Writers' Association was allowed (for the first and last time) to elect its own leaders, Liu Binyan received the second-highest number of votes to Ba Jin, the surviving May-Fourth era writer.

Liu in the United States
In December 1986, college students demonstrated in over a dozen Chinese cities in order to demand greater economic and political freedoms. Deng Xiaoping, after two straight weeks of student demonstrations, believed that the student movement was a result of "bourgeois liberalization", and named three Communist Party members to be expelled, including Fang Lizhi, Liu Binyan, and Wang Ruowang. Deng directed then-CCP General Secretary Hu Yaobang to expel them from the Party, but Hu refused. Because of his refusal, Hu was dismissed from his position as General Secretary, effectively ending his period of influence within the Chinese government.

In January 1987, as part of Deng Xiaoping's crackdown on "bourgeois liberalism," Liu Binyan was again expelled from the Communist Party. In spring of 1988 he came to the United States for teaching and writing; then, after publicly denouncing the Chinese government for the Tiananmen Square protests of 1989, he was barred from returning to China and never saw his homeland again. Although largely isolated from his Chinese readers, he continued to write about China where his sources often came from interviewing visitors from China.

He published articles critical of Chinese corruption for the Hong Kong media, and offered commentary for the U.S. government funded Radio Free Asia (nonetheless, he was reported to "detest American capitalism" and expressed dismay at a certain Chinese dissident's support for the Iraq war). Until the end, he remained an adherent of socialism with a human face, was critical of social inequality and consumerist cynicism in China, and stressed that the Communist Party of China, which he had joined as a youth, had many positive achievements before the Maoist crimes and its transformation into the "foul, reactionary force" that it was today.

He died in East Windsor, New Jersey on December 5, 2005 from complications due to colon cancer. He is survived by his wife, Zhu Hong.

External links
 Liu Binyan, a Fierce Insider Critic of China, Dies at 80 (The New York Times; December 6, 2005)
Obituary (Guardian Unlimited)
The 'Conscience of China' is dead (The Times; December 6, 2005)
Exiled Chinese writer Liu Binyan dead (UPI; December 6, 2005)
Leading Chinese dissident writer Liu Binyan dies at 80 (Japan Today; December 6, 2005)
China dissident Liu 'dies in US' The prominent Chinese dissident writer, Liu Binyan, has died at the age of 80 in the US, reports say. (BBC; December 5, 2005)

See also
 Wang Shouxin
Human rights in China
Anti-Rightist Movement
Cultural Revolution
Tiananmen Square protests of 1989
Fang Lizhi
Wang Ruowang
Sayaka Morohoshi
Communism in China

References

1925 births
2005 deaths
Chinese dissidents
Deaths from colorectal cancer
Deaths from cancer in New Jersey
People's Republic of China journalists
Writers from Changchun
International Writing Program alumni
Victims of the Anti-Rightist Campaign
Victims of the Cultural Revolution